Xyne is an extinct genus of prehistoric herring that lived during the Upper Miocene subepoch.
 
There are two species described: the type species, X. grex, and a second, deeper-bodied species, X. fitgeri.
Fossils are known from the Dicalite Quarry and Diatom Hill in California.

See also

 Prehistoric fish
 List of prehistoric bony fish

References

Miocene fish of North America
Clupeiformes